During the 1971 Bangladesh Liberation War, members of the Pakistani military and Razakars raped between 200,000 and 400,000 Bengali women and girls in a systematic campaign of genocidal rape. Most of the rape victims of the Pakistani Army and its allies were Hindu women. Some of these women died in captivity or committed suicide while others moved to India. Imams and Muslim religious leaders declared the women "war booty”. The activists and leaders of Islamic parties are also accused to be involved in the rapes and abduction of women.

The Pakistani elite believed that Hindus were behind the revolt and that as soon as there was a solution to the "Hindu problem" the conflict would resolve. For Pakistanis, the violence against Hindus was a strategic policy. Muslim Pakistani men believed the sacrifice of  Hindu women was needed to fix the national malaise. Anecdotal evidence suggests that Imams and Mullahs supported the rapes by the Pakistani Army and issued fatwas declaring the women war booty. A fatwa from West Pakistan during the war asserted that women taken from Bengali Hindus could be considered war booty. Those rapes apparently caused thousands of pregnancies, births of war babies, abortions, infanticide, suicide, and Ostracism of the victims. Recognized as one of the major occurrences of war crimes anywhere, the atrocities ended after surrender of the Pakistani military and supporting Razakar militias. Initially India claimed its support for the Mukti Bahini and later intervention was on humanitarian grounds, but after the UN rejected this argument, India claimed intervention was needed to protect its own security.

During the war, Bengali nationalists also committed mass rape of ethnic Bihari Muslim women, since the Bihari Muslim community supported Pakistan. Indian soldiers as well as Bengali militiamen were also identified as perpetrators of rape by scholar Yasmin Saikia. Yasmin Saikia was informed repeatedly in Bangladesh that Pakistani, Bengali, and Bihari men raped Hindu women during the war.

In 2009, almost 40 years after the events of 1971, a report published by the War Crimes Fact Finding Committee of Bangladesh accused 1,597 people of war crimes, including rape. Since 2010 the International Crimes Tribunal (ICT) has indicted, tried and sentenced several people to life imprisonment or death for their actions during the conflict. The stories of the rape victims have been told in movies and literature, and depicted in art. The rape victims have been recognized as Birangona or "war heroines" by the government of Bangladesh.The term Biragonga was first introduced by Sheikh Mujib in 1971, in an attempt to prevent them from being outcast by the society.

Background 

Following the partition of India and the creation of Pakistan the East and West wings were separated not only geographically, but also culturally. The authorities of the West viewed the Bengali Muslim in the East as "too Bengali" and their application of Islam as "inferior and impure", and this made them unreliable. To this extent the West began a strategy to forcibly assimilate the Bengalis culturally. The Bengalis of East Pakistan were chiefly Muslim, but their numbers were interspersed with a significant Hindu minority. Very few spoke Urdu, which in 1948 had been declared the national language of Pakistan. To express their opposition, activists in East Pakistan founded the Bengali language movement.  Earlier, in 1949, other activists had founded the Awami League as an alternative to the ruling Muslim League in West Pakistan.  In the next decade and half, Bengalis became gradually disenchanted with the balance of power in Pakistan, which was under military rule during much of this time; eventually some began to call for secession. By the late 1960s, a perception had emerged that the people of East Pakistan were second-class citizens.  It did not help that General A. A. K. Niazi, head of Pakistani Forces in East Pakistan, called East Pakistan a "low-lying land of low, lying people".

There had been opposition to military rule in West Pakistan as well.  Eventually the military relented, and in December 1970 the first ever elections were held.  To the surprise of many, East Pakistan's Awami League, headed by Sheikh Mujibur Rahman, won a clear majority. The West Pakistani establishment was displeased with the results. In Dacca following the election a general said "Don't worry, we will not allow these black bastards to rule over us". Soon President Yahya Khan banned the Awami League and declared martial law in East Pakistan.

With the goal of putting down Bengali nationalism, the Pakistan Army launched Operation Searchlight on 25 March 1971. According to Eric Heinze the Pakistani forces targeted both Bengali Muslims and Hindus  In the ensuing 1971 Bangladesh genocide, the army caused the deaths of up to 3 million people, created up to 10 million refugees who fled to India, and displaced a further 30 million within East Pakistan.

Rounaq Jahan alleges elements of racism in the Pakistan army, who he says considered the Bengalis "racially inferior—a non-martial and physically weak race", and has accused the army of using organised rape as a weapon of war. According to the political scientist R. J. Rummel, the Pakistani army looked upon the Bengalis as "subhuman" and that the Hindus were "as Jews to the Nazis, scum and vermin that best be exterminated". This racism was then expressed in that the Bengalis, being inferior, must have their gene pool "fixed" through forcible impregnation. Belén Martín Lucas has described the rapes as "ethnically motivated".

Pakistani Army actions 
The attacks were led by General Tikka Khan, who was the architect of Operation Searchlight and was given the name the "butcher of Bengal" by the Bengalis for his actions. Khan said—when reminded on 27 March 1971 that he was in charge of a majority province—"I will reduce this majority to a minority". Bina D'Costa believes an anecdote used by Khan is significant, in that it provides proof of the mass rapes being a deliberate strategy. In Jessore, while speaking with a group of journalists Khan was reported to have said, "Pehle inko Mussalman karo". D'Costa argues that this shows that in the highest echelons of the armed forces the Bengalis were perceived as being disloyal Muslims and unpatriotic Pakistanis.

Jessica Lee Rehman calls rape in 1971 an instance of religious terrorism. She said "The Pakistan Army is an Islamic institution, its soldiers are warriors of God and ...they rape in God's name. Therefore the raping of girls and women, the forced bodily transgressions, and the mutilations are considered to be a triumph for good." Bengalis were dehumanised and Bengali women were perceived as prostitutes inviting sex. They were thought to have Hindu features which deleted any thought for their "Muslim" status that might prevent a perpetrator's savage activities. Faisal, a Pakistani officer who had been in East Pakistan portrays Bengali culture in terms of the differences between East and West Pakistani ladies, pushing the open discrimination against Bengali women: "The women bathe openly so that men walking by can see them, and they wear saris that with one pull fall off their body, like Indians. They are very attached to music, like Hindus, and they have their daughters dance for guests, they take pride in this dancing and music, like prostitutes. My daughter does not dance, neither does my wife. This music and dancing isn't Islamic. Our ladies are not prostitutes like Bengalis." A Bengali Muslim lady Ferdousi Priyabhashini says the soldiers raping her said to her "You are a Hindu! You are a spy"  because she wore a sari and bindi.

The perpetrators conducted nighttime raids, assaulting women in their villages, often in front of their families, as part of the terror campaign. Victims were also kidnapped and held in special camps where they were repeatedly assaulted. Many of those held in the camps were murdered or committed suicide, with some taking their own lives by using their hair to hang themselves; the soldiers responded to these suicides by cutting the women's hair off. Time magazine reported on 563 girls who had been kidnapped and held by the military; all of them were between three and five months pregnant when the military began to release them. Some women were forcibly used as prostitutes. While the Pakistani government estimated the number of rapes in the hundreds, other estimates range between 200,000 and 400,000. The Pakistani government had tried to censor reports coming out of the region, but media reports on the atrocities did reach the public worldwide, and gave rise to widespread international public support for the liberation movement.

In what has been described by Jenneke Arens as a deliberate attempt to destroy an ethnic group, many of those assaulted were raped, murdered and then bayoneted in the genitalia. Adam Jones, a political scientist, has said that one of the reasons for the mass rapes was to undermine Bengali society through the "dishonoring" of Bengali women and that some women were raped until they died or were killed following repeated attacks.  The International Commission of Jurists concluded that the atrocities carried out by the Pakistan armed forces "were part of a deliberate policy by a disciplined force". The writer Mulk Raj Anand said the rapes were too widespread and systematic to be anything but conscious military policy, "planned by the West Pakistanis in a deliberate effort to create a new race" or to undermine Bengali separatism. Amita Malik, reporting from Bangladesh following the Pakistan armed forces surrender, wrote that one West Pakistani soldier said: "We are going. But we are leaving our seed behind".

Not all Pakistani military personnel supported the violence: General Sahabzada Yaqub Khan, who advised the president against military action, and Major Ikram Sehgal both resigned in protest, as did Air Marshal Asghar Khan. Ghaus Bakhsh Bizenjo, a Balochi politician, and Khan Abdul Wali Khan, leader of the National Awami Party, protested over the actions of the armed forces. Those imprisoned for their dissenting views on the violence included Sabihuddin Ghausi and I. A. Rahman, who were both journalists, the Sindhi leader G. M. Syed, the poet Ahmad Salim, Anwar Pirzado, who was a member of the air force, Professor M. R. Hassan, Tahera Mazhar and Imtiaz Ahmed. Malik Ghulam Jilani, who was also arrested, had openly opposed the armed action in the East; a letter he had written to Yahya Khan was widely publicised. Altaf Hussain Gauhar, the editor of the Dawn newspaper, was also imprisoned. In 2013 Jilani and Faiz Ahmad Faiz, a poet, were honoured by the Bangladeshi government for their actions.

Militias 
According to Peter Tomsen, a political scientist, Pakistan's secret service the Directorate for Inter-Services Intelligence, in conjunction with the political party Jamaat-e-Islami, formed militias such as Al-Badr ("the moon") and the Al-Shams ("the sun") to conduct operations against the nationalist movement. These militias targeted non-combatants and committed rapes as well as other crimes. Local collaborators known as Razakars also took part in the atrocities. The term has since become a pejorative akin to the western term "Judas".

Members of the Muslim League, such as Nizam-e-Islam, Jamaat-e-Islami and Jamiat Ulema Pakistan, who had lost the election, collaborated with the military and acted as an intelligence organisation for them. Members of Jamaat-e-Islami and some of its leaders collaborated with the Pakistani forces in rapes and targeted killings. The atrocities by Al-Badr and the Al-Shams garnered worldwide attention from news agencies; accounts of massacres and rapes were widely reported.

Hindu victims
The Pakistani elite believed that Hindus were behind the revolt and that as soon as there was a solution to the "Hindu problem" the conflict would resolve. For Pakistanis, the violence against Hindus was a strategic policy. Muslim Pakistani men believed the sacrifice of  Hindu women was needed to fix the national malaise. Anecdotal evidence suggests that Imams and Mullahs supported the rapes by the Pakistani Army and issued fatwas declaring the women war booty. A fatwa from West Pakistan during the war asserted that women taken from Bengali Hindus could be considered war booty.

The mostly Punjabi soldiers hated anything to do with Hinduism. The extreme hatred Pakistanis felt towards Hindus could be seen in their especially brutal violence against Hindus as the Pakistani Army and its local allies raped and murdered Hindu women. The implication for Bengali women of being connected in any way to a "Hindu" identity was rape by the Army. Women were captured and taken to camps established throughout the country. In these military camps and cantonments the Pakistani soldiers kept the captives as their sex-slaves.

Female Hindu captives were raped in Pakistani Army camps. The Pakistani Army committed mass rape of Hindu women because they were Hindus and the Army intended to destroy their faith, social position and self-esteem. The policy of raping Hindu captives intended to change the community's bloodline. The total effect of mass sexual violence against Hindu women demonstrated the existence of the genocidal actus reas. In the Akayesu case the Bangladeshi Tribunal emphasised that the violence against Hindu women was committed not just against them individually but because of their membership of their community.

Bina D'Costa spoke with many respondents who especially mentioned the brutality of Pakistan's army in its "handling" of Hindus. The members from the Hindu community with whom she interacted with firmly believed in the persecution of Hindus by the Pakistan army and Razakaar during the war. Hindu women who were kidnapped by Pakistan army were never seen again; mostly they were killed after being raped. Bina D'Costa interacted with families of two Hindu women who were taken by "Punjabi" army men, neither of them returned to their respective homes after the war. Aubrey Menen who was a war correspondent wrote about a 17 year old Hindu bride who was gang raped by six Pakistani soldiers according to her father.

Two went into the room that had been built for the bridal couple. The others stayed behind with the family, one of them covering them with his gun. They heard a barked order, and the bridegroom's voice protesting. Then there was silence until the bride screamed...In a few minutes one of the soldiers came out, his uniform in disarray. He grinned to his companions. Another soldier took his place in the extra room. And so on, until all six had raped the belle of the village. Then all six left, hurriedly. The father found his daughter lying on the string unconscious and bleeding. Her husband was crouched on the floor, kneeling over his vomit.

Aftermath 

In the immediate aftermath of the war, one pressing problem was the very high number of unwanted pregnancies of rape victims. Estimates of the number of pregnancies resulting in births range from 25,000 to the Bangladeshi government's figure of 70,000, while one publication by the Centre for Reproductive Law and Policy gave a total of 250,000. A government-mandated victim relief programme was set up with the support of the World Health Organization and International Planned Parenthood Federation, among whose goals it was to organise abortion facilities to help rape victims terminate unwanted pregnancies. A doctor at a rehabilitation centre in Dhaka reported 170,000 abortions of pregnancies caused by the rapes, and the births of 30,000 war babies during the first three months of 1972. Dr. Geoffrey Davis, an Australian doctor and abortion specialist who worked for the programme, estimated that there had been about 5,000 cases of self-induced abortions. He also said that during his work he heard of numerous infanticides and suicides by victims. His estimate of the total number of rape victims was 400,000, twice as high as the official estimate of 200,000 cited by the Bangladeshi government. Most of the victims also contracted sexual infections. Many suffered from feelings of intense shame and humiliation, and a number were ostracised by their families and communities or committed suicide.

The feminist writer Cynthia Enloe has written that some pregnancies were intended by the soldiers and perhaps their officers as well. A report from the International Commission of Jurists said, "Whatever the precise numbers, the teams of American and British surgeons carrying out abortions and the widespread government efforts to persuade people to accept these girls into the community, testify to the scale on which raping occurred". The commission also said that Pakistani officers not only allowed their men to rape, but enslaved women themselves.

Following the conflict the rape victims were seen as a symbol of "social pollution" and shame. Few were able to return to families or old homes because of this. Sheikh Mujibur Rahman called the victims birangona ("heroine"), but this served as a reminder that these women were now deemed socially unacceptable as they were "dishonored", and the term became associated with barangona ("prostitute"). The official strategy of marrying the women off and encouraging them to be seen as war heroines failed as few men came forward, and those who did expected the state to provide a large dowry. Those women who did marry were usually mistreated, and the majority of men, once having received a dowry, abandoned their wives.

On 18 February 1972 the state formed the Bangladesh Women's Rehabilitation Board, which was tasked with helping the victims of rape and to help with the adoption programme. Several international agencies took part in the adoption programme, such as Mother Teresa's Sisters of Charity. The majority of the war babies were adopted in the Netherlands and Canada as the state wished to remove the reminders of Pakistan from the newly formed nation. However, not all women wanted their child taken, and some were forcibly removed and sent for adoption, a practice which was encouraged by Rahman, who said, "I do not want those polluted blood [sic] in this country". While many women were glad for the abortion programme, as they did not have to bear a child conceived of rape, others had to go full term, filled with hatred towards the child they carried. Others, who had their children adopted out so as to return to "mainstream life", would not look at their newborn as it was taken from them. In the 1990s many of these children returned to Bangladesh to search for their birth mothers. In 2008, D'Costa attempted to find those who had been adopted, however very few responded, one who did said "I hated being a kid, and I am angry at Bangladesh for not taking care of me when I needed it most. I don’t have any roots and that makes me cry. So that is why I am trying to learn more about where I was born."

Forty years after the war, two sisters who had been raped were interviewed by Deutsche Welle. Aleya stated she had been taken by the Pakistani army when she was thirteen, and was gang raped repeatedly for seven months. She states she was tortured and was five months pregnant when she returned to her home. Her sister, Laily, says she was pregnant when she was taken by the armed forces, and lost the child. Later she fought alongside the Mukti Bahini. Both say that the state has failed the birangona, and that all they received was "humiliation, insults, hatred, and ostracism."

Pakistani government reaction 
After the conflict, the Pakistani government decided on a policy of silence regarding the rapes. They set up the Hamoodur Rahman Commission, a judicial commission to prepare an account of the circumstances surrounding the atrocities of the 1971 war and Pakistan's surrender. The commission was highly critical of the army. The chiefs of staff of the army and the Pakistan Air Force were removed from their positions for attempting to interfere with the commission. The Commission based its reports on interviews with politicians, officers and senior commanders. The final reports were submitted in July 1972, but all were subsequently destroyed except for one held by Zulfikar Ali Bhutto, the Pakistani president. The findings were never made public.

In 1974 the commission was reopened and issued a supplementary report, which remained classified for 25 years until published by the magazine India Today. The report said that 26,000 people were killed, rapes numbered in the hundreds, and that the Mukti Bahini rebels engaged in widespread rape and other human rights abuses. Sumit Ganguly, a political scientist, believes that the Pakistani establishment has yet to come to terms with the atrocities carried out, saying that, in a visit to Bangladesh in 2002, Pervez Musharraf expressed regret for the atrocities rather than accepting responsibility.

War Crimes prosecutions 

In 2008, after a 17-year investigation, the War Crimes Fact Finding Committee released documentation identifying 1,597 people who had taken part in the atrocities. The list included members of the Jamaat-e-Islami and the Bangladesh Nationalist Party, a political group founded in 1978. In 2010 the government of Bangladesh set up the International Crimes Tribunal (ICT) to investigate the atrocities of that era. While Human Rights Watch has been supportive of the tribunal, it has also been critical of reported harassment of lawyers representing the accused. Brad Adams, director of the Asia branch of Human Rights Watch, has said that those accused must be given the full protection of the law to avoid the risk of the trials not being taken seriously, and Irene Khan, a human rights activist, has expressed doubt about whether the mass rapes and killings of women will be addressed. Khan has said of her government's reaction:

The deputy leader of Jamaat-e-Islami, Delwar Hossain Sayeedi, the first person to face charges related to the conflict, was indicted by the ICT on twenty counts of war crimes, which included murder, rape and arson. He denied all charges. On 28 February 2013, Sayeedi was found guilty of genocide, rape and religious persecution, and was sentenced to death by hanging. Four other members of Jamaat-e-Islami Bangladesh, including Motiur Rahman Nizami, have also been indicted for war crimes. Abul Kalam Azad, a member of the Razakars, was the first person to be sentenced for crimes during the war. He was found guilty of murder and rape in absentia, and was sentenced to death. Muhammad Kamaruzzaman, senior assistant secretary general of Bangladesh Jamaat-e-Islami, faced seven charges of war crimes, including planning and advising on the rape of women in the village of Shohaghpur on 25 July 1971. The ICT sentenced him to death by hanging on 9 May 2013. In July 2013 Ghulam Azam was given a ninety-year sentence for rape and mass murder during the conflict.  Abdul Quader Molla, a member of the Razakar militia during the war was charged with abetting the Pakistani army and actively participating in the 1971 Bangladesh atrocities: rape (including the rape of minors) and mass murder of Bangladeshis in the Mirpur area of Dhaka during the Bangladesh Liberation War. After the government had amended the war crimes law to allow a sentence to be appealed based on leniency of punishment, prosecutors appealed to the Supreme Court of Bangladesh and asked for it to upgrade Molla's sentence from life in prison to death. On 17 September 2013, the Supreme Court accepted the appeal and sentenced Molla to death. Finally he was hanged in Dhaka Central Jail on 12 December 2013 at 22:01.

In literature and media 

Orunodoyer Ognishakhi (Pledge to a New Dawn), the first film about the war, was screened in 1972 on the first Bangladeshi Independence Day celebration. It draws on the experiences of an actor called Altaf. While trying to reach safe haven in Calcutta, he encounters women who have been raped. The images of these birangona, stripped and vacant-eyed from the trauma, are used as testimony to the assault. Other victims Altaf meets are shown committing suicide or having lost their minds.

In 1995 Gita Sahgal produced the documentary War Crimes File, which was screened on Channel 4. In 2011 the film Meherjaan was shown at the Guwahati International Film Festival. It explores the war from two perspectives: that of a woman who loved a Pakistani soldier and that of a person born from rape.

In 1994, the book Ami Birangana Bolchi (The Voices of War Heroines) by Nilima Ibrahim was released. It is a collection of eyewitness testimony from seven rape victims, which Ibrahim documented while working in rehabilitation centres. The narratives of the survivors in this work is heavily critical of post-war Bangladeshi society's failure to support the victims of rape.

Published in 2012, the book Rising from the Ashes: Women's Narratives of 1971 includes oral testimonies of women affected by the Liberation War. As well as an account from Taramon Bibi, who fought and was awarded the Bir Protik (Symbol of Valour) for her actions, there are nine interviews with women who were raped. The book's publication in English at the time of the fortieth anniversary of the war was noted in the New York Times as an "important oral history".

The 2014 film Children of War tries to capture this horror. The film by Mrityunjay Devvrat starring  Farooq Sheikh, Victor Banerjee, Raima Sen, among others is meant to "send shivers down the viewers' spine. We want to make it so repulsive that no one even entertains the thought of pardoning rapists, let alone commit the crime. The shoot took its toll on all of us."

Footnotes

References

Bibliography

External links

 Report from the International Commission of Jurists

Bangladesh Liberation War
Crimes against women
Genocide victims
Human rights abuses
Military history of Pakistan
Pakistan Army
Liberation War
Wartime sexual violence
Anti-Hindu violence in Bangladesh
Bangladesh
Pakistani war crimes
Pakistan military scandals
Violence against women in Bangladesh
Persecution of Bengali Hindus